Annex J is a specification in ITU-T Recommendations G.992.3 and G.992.5 for all digital mode ADSL with improved spectral compatibility with ADSL over ISDN, which means that it is a type of naked DSL which will not disturb existing  Annex B ADSL services in the same cable binder.

This specification has the same upstream/downstream frequency split of 276 kHz as Annex B, but does not have lower frequency limit of 138 kHz, allowing upstream bandwidth to be increased from 1.8 Mbit/s to 3.5 Mbit/s. This is similar to Annex M, but Annex J can not have POTS on the same line.

Deutsche Telekom started deploying Annex J in 2011, Vodafone Germany followed suit in April 2015 (marketed as quality improvements).

External links
ITU-T Recommendation G.992.3: Asymmetric digital subscriber line transceivers 2 (ADSL2)
ITU-T Recommendation G.992.5: Asymmetric Digital SubscriberLine (ADSL) transceivers - Extended bandwidth ADSL2 (ADSL2+)

References

ITU-T recommendations
ITU-T G Series Recommendations
Digital subscriber line
G.992.2_Annex_J
Telecommunications-related introductions in 2002